"Dr. Stein" is a song by the German power metal band Helloween. Taken from the 1988 album Keeper of the Seven Keys Part 2, the song remains one of the band's most popular songs, and is played live at virtually every Helloween concert. The lyrics are based on the 1818 novel Frankenstein; or, The Modern Prometheus.

A video was shot for the 2010 jazz-style remake of the song on the album Unarmed – Best of 25th Anniversary.

Single track listing

Personnel
Michael Kiske - vocals
Kai Hansen - lead and rhythm guitars
Michael Weikath - lead and rhythm guitars
Markus Grosskopf - bass guitar
Ingo Schwichtenberg - drums

Charts

References

1988 singles
Helloween songs
Songs about Frankenstein's monster
Songs written by Michael Weikath